John Merrick may refer to:

 John Merrick (MP) (1584–1670), English politician elected Member of Parliament for Newcastle-under-Lyme in the Short Parliament
 John Merrick (ambassador) (fl. c. 1596–1621), English ambassador to Russia
 John Merrick (architect) (1756–1829), best known for Province House in Nova Scotia, Canada
 John Merrick (insurance) (1859–1919), African-American founder of North Carolina Mutual & Provident Insurance Company in Durham, North Carolina
 John Merrick (golfer) (born 1982), American golfer
 John Merrick (Buffyverse character)
 Joseph Merrick (1862–1890), the Elephant Man; early biographies inaccurately give his first name as "John", and this name was used in the 1980 film The Elephant Man

See also
 John Merricks (1971–1997), British sailor